Charles Paul Conn (born December 23, 1945) is Chancellor and former President of Lee University in Cleveland, Tennessee. Conn became president of Lee University in 1986 and announced retirement in 2019. He retired in 2020 to become chancellor. He was the longest serving CEO of any college or university in Tennessee history.

Education
Conn acquired his undergraduate degree in religion from Lee University (then Lee College). He received an M.A. and a Ph.D. in psychology from Emory University (Atlanta, GA) and subsequently went on to spend eight semesters in post-doctoral study at Harvard University (Boston, Mass.) in the Graduate School of Education. He was a visiting scholar at Harvard Divinity School in 1982.

Conn's father, Charles William Conn, was Lee University's 15th president.

Career
Conn began his career at Lee College in 1972, and was appointed as a professor in the psychology faculty and chair of the Department of Behavioral Sciences. He was appointed Vice President of Institutional Advancement in 1984 and President of Lee College (now Lee University) in 1986. He continues teaching in the Department of Behavioral and Social Sciences, and served a term as Visiting Professor of Psychology at Appalachian State University.

Conn has served on the Southern Association of Colleges and Schools Commission on Colleges, holding positions as commissioner, member of the Executive Committee, and member of the Appeals Committee. He served from 2007 to 2010 on the national board of directors of the Council of Independent Colleges. He has also held positions with the Appalachian College Association, the Council for Christian Colleges and Universities, the Southern States Athletic Conference, and the Tennessee Independent Colleges and Universities Association.

During his tenure enrollment at Lee quintupled from 1,000 to 5,000 students and more than 30 campus buildings were constructed.

Writing career
Conn has authored or co-authored 20 books.

 Battle for Africa, by Brother Andrew with Charles Paul Conn
 Believe, by Richard M. DeVos with Charles Paul Conn
 Dad, Mom, and the Church, by Charles Paul Conn
 Disguised, by Patricia Moore with Charles Paul Conn
 Eckerd: Finding the Right Prescription, by Jack Eckerd and Charles Paul Conn
 Father Care, by Charles Paul Conn
 Hooked on a Good Thing, by Sammy Hall with Charles Paul Conn
 Julian Carroll of Kentucky, by Charles Paul Conn
 Just Off Chicken Street, by Floyd McClung, Jr. with Charles Paul Conn
 Kathy, by Barbara Miller and Charles Paul Conn
 The Magnificent Three, by Nicky Cruz with Charles Paul Conn
 Making it Happen, by Charles Paul Conn
 Music Makers: A Profile of the Lee Singers, by Charles Paul Conn
 The New Johnny Cash, by Charles Paul Conn
 No Easy Game, by Terry Bradshaw with Charles Paul Conn
 The Possible Dream: A Candid Look at Amway, by Charles Paul Conn
 The Power of Positive Students, by Dr. William Mitchell with Dr. Charles Paul Conn
 Promises to Keep: The Amway Phenomenon and How it Works, by Charles Paul Conn
 An Uncommon Freedom, by Charles Paul Conn
 The Winner’s Circle, by Charles Paul Conn

References

Living people
1945 births
Presidents of Lee University
Emory University alumni
Lee University alumni
Harvard University staff
Appalachian State University faculty
Pentecostals from Tennessee